Nasrollah Kasraian (born 1944 in Khorramabad, Iran) is an internationally renowned Iranian photographer and has been called the "father of Iranian ethno-photography". He and his wife, anthropologist Ziba Arshi, have documented the lives of various populations living within the borders of Iran, while publishing more than 40 books and various other media. Kasraian's work on the Turkman's of Iran has been adapted for the screen by Babek Karimi. His work has initiated new branches of research, such as anthropological studies of Kurdistan, and influenced a generation of Iranian photographers.

Biography
A graduate in law from Tehran University, Kasraian abandoned that profession and fully engaged in photography since 1966, citing an encounter with a French photographer as the decisive moment.

Due to this work and the work of his brothers, all equally engaged in the arts, the family has had a strong impact on the contemporary art.

Nasrollah Kasraian is married to Ziba Arshi, an anthropologist who accompanies him on his expeditions and collaborates with him in the publication of his works. They have three daughters and live in Tehran.

Photography career
Kasraian travels around Iran taking pictures of all ethnic groups and publishes them in photobooks often dedicated to specific ethnicities. He recounts having used more than 28 cars during the years due to his extensive trips to remote areas of the country. The pictures are typically supplemented by detailed texts about everyday life, culture and history of the ethnic group, often written by Kasraian's wife Ziba Arshi, whose view as an anthropologist has had a strong impact on his work.  Kasraian's aim is to depict the entire ethnological diversity of Iran, an endeavor generally applauded by Iranian population but not uncontroversial amongst more conservative elements of Iranian society.

Kasraian cites the publication of his photobook L'iran rurale by the renowned French publisher Doublepage as a turning point in his career.

A further milestone was the publication of The nomadic people of Iran by Richard Tapper and Jon Thompson with hundreds of photos by Kasraian , whose work has stimulated some of the essays on the tribal peoples of Iran by a dozen anthropologists in the book.

The book Tehran, which includes works by Hamideh Zolfaqari, winner of the Prix de la Photographie Paris,
displays the shift from traditionalism to modernity in the Iranian capital.

Kasraian's work has been exhibited in various countries, with his first U.S. photography exhibit hosted in 2017 at the University of Maryland.

His autobiography was published in 2015 by artebox, an extensive interview in Persian with the artist about his life and work.

Besides his work as a photographer, Kasraian has also translated books such as Andreas Feininger's The Complete Photographer into Persian.

Published photo books
 Damavand, 1992, 
 Isfahan, 1999, 
Persepolis, 5.Auflage: 1998, 
 Nomads of Iran, 2001, 
Our Homeland Iran, 2001, 
Tehran, 1990, 
Isfahan, 1990, 
Turkmans of Iran, 1991, 
Masouleh, 2001, 
Nature of Iran, 2001, 
Balechustan, 2002, 
Kurdistan, 1990, 
L'iran rurale, 1984,

References

External links
Interview in Persian with English subtitles
Interview in Persian
The photographer's notes
Kasraian's personal website
An article about Kasraian on Iranian.com
Some pictures of the calendar "Bam", dedicated to the city after the earthquake
The writing of the postscript "The Ship" 
Review of "The nomadic people of Iran"
 Photos from his latest book, Gozaar

Iranian photographers
People from Khorramabad
University of Tehran alumni
1944 births
Living people